Robert A. Silverman (born February 24, 1938) is a Canadian actor cast five times by writer/director David Cronenberg. He is sometimes credited as Bob Silverman or Robert Silverman. He has also acted in the Friday the 13th: The Series episodes "Hate On Your Dial" and "Faith Healer" (directed by Cronenberg), and acted with him in Jason X.

Silverman was a Genie Award nominee for Best Supporting Actor at the 1st Genie Awards in 1980 for The Brood, and was nominated in 2003 for a Gemini Award for Best Performance by an Actor in a Guest Role in a Dramatic Series in The Eleventh Hour.

Silverman has been cast by Cronenberg in the following films:
eXistenZ (1999) as D'Arcy Nader
Naked Lunch (1991) as Hans
Scanners (1981) as Benjamin Pierce
The Brood (1979) as Jan Hartog
Rabid (1977) as Man In Hospital

Filmography

References

External links

1938 births
Living people
Canadian male film actors
American male film actors
Male actors from Montreal
Anglophone Quebec people
20th-century Canadian male actors
21st-century Canadian male actors